Novaci is a municipality in the southern part of North Macedonia. Novaci is also the name of the village where the municipal seat is found. Novaci Municipality is a part of the Pelagonia Statistical Region. Located in the municipality is North Macedonia's key energy company REK Bitola.

History
In the 2003 territorial division of North Macedonia, the rural municipalities of Bač and Staravina were merged with Novaci Municipality.

Demographics 
According to the last national census from 2021, this municipality has 2,648 inhabitants. Ethnic groups in the municipality include:

Inhabited places

Armatuš
Bač
Biljanik
Bladovenci
Brnik
Brod
Budimirci
Dalbegovci
Dobromiri
Dobroveni
Dolno Aglarci
Dolno Orehovo
Germijan
Gneotino
Gnileš
Gorno Aglarci
Gradešnica
Grumaži
Gruništa
Iveni
Makovo
Meglenci
Novaci (seat)
Novo Selo
Orle
Paralovo
Petalino
Rapeš
Polog
Ribarci
Skočivir
Slivica
Sovik
Staravina
Suvo Dol
Tepavci
Veleselo
Vranjevci
Zovig
Zoviḱ
Živojno

Twin Municipalities
  Albania, Pustec Municipality
  Bulgaria, Borovan
  Croatia, Dugi Rat
  Slovenia, Municipality of Hrpelje-Kozina
  Hungary, Farmos
  Greece, Koufalia

References

External links
 Official website
  Novaci Municipality with the Mariovo region 

 
Pelagonia Statistical Region
Municipalities of North Macedonia